Legionnaires in Paris is a 1927 American silent comedy film directed by Arvid E. Gillstrom and starring Al Cooke, Kit Guard and Louise Lorraine. It was also known by the alternative title of French Leave.

Synopsis
Two doughboys in leave in Paris on Armistice Day 1918 mistakenly believe they have killed a man and go on the run from the police.

Cast
 Al Cooke as Al Cooke 
 Kit Guard as Kit Guard 
 Louise Lorraine as Annette 
 Virginia Sale as Fifi 
 John Aasen as Shorty

References

Bibliography
 Munden, Kenneth White. The American Film Institute Catalog of Motion Pictures Produced in the United States, Part 1. University of California Press, 1997.

External links
 

1927 films
1927 comedy films
1920s English-language films
American silent feature films
Silent American comedy films
Films directed by Arvid E. Gillstrom
American black-and-white films
Film Booking Offices of America films
Films set in Paris
1920s American films